The 1927 UCI Track Cycling World Championships were the World Championship for track cycling. They took place in Cologne and Elberfeld, Germany from 17–24 July 1927. Three events for men were contested, two for professionals and one for amateurs.

Medal summary

Medal table

See also
 1927 UCI Road World Championships

References

Track cycling
UCI Track Cycling World Championships by year
International cycle races hosted by Germany
Sports competitions in Cologne
1927 in track cycling